Oberschlettenbach is a municipality in Südliche Weinstraße district, in Rhineland-Palatinate, western Germany.

References

Municipalities in Rhineland-Palatinate
Palatinate Forest